Bartelt is a surname. Notable people with the surname include:

Gustavo Bartelt (born 1974), Argentine footballer
William Bartelt (born 1946), American historian and author